Grießen Pass (el. 975 m.) is a high mountain pass in the Austrian Alps between the federal states of Salzburg and Tyrol.

It connects the Kitzbühel Alps and the Leogang Steinberge.

The road over the pass leads from Hochfilzen in Tyrol to Leogang in Salzburg, but it lies almost entirely in the state of Salzburg.

The pass is traversed by the Salzburg-Tyrol Railway and the Hochkönig-Straße (B164).

See also
 List of highest paved roads in Europe
 List of mountain passes

Mountain passes of Tyrol (state)
Mountain passes of Salzburg (state)
Kitzbühel Alps